Hansonville is an unincorporated community in southern Russell County, Virginia. 
It is located the junction of US Route 58 Alternate and US Route 19.

References

Unincorporated communities in Russell County, Virginia
Unincorporated communities in Virginia